Alfred Ernest Batty (20 September 1879 – 19 December 1970) was an Australian rules footballer who played with Geelong in the Victorian Football League (VFL).

Notes

External links 

1879 births
1970 deaths
Australian rules footballers from Victoria (Australia)
Geelong Football Club players
Barwon Football Club players